The 2020 Viterra Saskatchewan Scotties Tournament of Hearts, the provincial women's curling championship for Saskatchewan, was held from January 24–28 at the Horizone Credit Union Centre in Melville, Saskatchewan. The winning Robyn Silvernagle rink represented Saskatchewan on home turf at the 2020 Scotties Tournament of Hearts in Moose Jaw, Saskatchewan and finished with a 6–5 record.

Teams
The teams are listed as follows:

Knockout brackets

A event

B event

C event

Knockout results
All draws are listed in Central Time (UTC−06:00).

Draw 1
Friday, January 24, 2:00 pm

Draw 2
Friday, January 24, 7:30 pm

Draw 3
Saturday, January 25, 9:00 am

Draw 4
Saturday, January 25, 3:00 pm

Draw 5
Saturday, January 25, 7:30 pm

Draw 6
Sunday, January 26, 10:00 am

Draw 7
Sunday, January 26, 3:00 pm

Draw 8
Sunday, January 26, 7:30 pm

Draw 9
Monday, January 27, 1:00 pm

Playoffs

A vs. B
Monday, January 27, 7:30 pm

C1 vs. C2
Monday, January 27, 7:30 pm

Semifinal
Tuesday, January 28, 9:30 am

Final
Tuesday, January 28, 2:30 pm

References

External links

2020 in Saskatchewan
Curling in Saskatchewan
2020 Scotties Tournament of Hearts
January 2020 sports events in Canada